The Winston-Salem Wolves are a professional minor league basketball franchise based in Winston-Salem, North Carolina. The team was founded in December, 2018.
 
The team is playing in the East Coast Basketball League (ECBL) for the 2019 regular season, in addition to participating against teams from other minor leagues and college programs. 
The 2019 Wolves regular home games are played in the Childress Activities Center on the campus of Forsyth Country Day School in Lewisville, NC.

Current roster

History 

After establishing the team in December, 2018, the team then announced the hiring of David Solomon as head coach during that same month.

The first player signed to the roster was Antonio Robinson, a 6'4" point guard who played collegiate basketball for East Carolina University, and had international experience as a professional in 
China and the UK.

The team's first game in franchise history was a scrimmage versus the Gastonia Snipers, a professional travel team, which the Wolves won 107–97.

The Wolves then opened up their first ECBL regular season on the road against division rival Rowan County Bulls with a win, 131–120.

Historical Performance

Team information 

League: East Coast Basketball League
Conference: Northern
Division: Northeast

Official Team Site: WSWolves.com

Staff 

Head Coach: David Solomon
Assistant Coach: Kevin Beard
Assistant Coach: Aaron Hogner

Co-Owner/General Manager: Marcus Shockley

Co-Owner/Director of Operations: Kishon Bishop

News/Links 

Winston-Salem Wolves Win Exhibition Opener over Gastonia Snipers

New Minor League Basketball Team to Debut in Winston Salem in 2019 (Dec 11, 2018)

Winston-Salem Wolves Join ECBL (Dec 10, 2018)

External links
 Official website

References

Basketball teams established in 2018
Basketball teams in North Carolina
2018 establishments in North Carolina
Basketball in Winston-Salem, North Carolina